Meyenberg Goat Milk is a brand of goat milk products created by the son of John Baptiste Meyenberg. Meyenberg was established in 1934. Goat milk was first evaporated by John P. Meyenberg, John B. Meyenberg's son.

In 1921, John P. Meyenberg established the Meyenberg Milk Product Company in Salinas, California. The company, now owned by Jackson family, is located in Turlock, California.

On the back of a carton of Meyenberg goat milk it reads: "The MEYENBERG tradition of producing quality goat milk in the late 1800s when a Swiss immigrant invented the process for evaporating cow's milk."

Production
Meyenberg Goat Milk Products are the top producers of commercially distributed goat milk in the United States. Among the products sold by the company are powdered and liquid milk, butter and cheddar cheese.

References

Goats
Dairy products companies of the United States
Products introduced in 1934
Milk